Thomas Gene Porter (April 21, 1929 – January 24, 2013) was an American football and ice hockey coach. He served two stints as the head football coach at St. Olaf College in Northfield, Minnesota from 1958 to 1967 and 1969 to 1990, compiling a record of 171–119–10. Porter was also the head ice hockey coach at St. Olaf from 1970 to 1977, tallying a mark of 24–110.

A native of Stillwater, Minnesota, Porter attended high school in Bayport, Minnesota. He played football and ice hockey at St. Olaf before graduating in 1951. Porter began his coaching career in 1954 as an assistant football coach at Neenah High School in Neenah, Wisconsin under head coach Jerry Thompson. He succeeded Thompson has head coach 1956 when Thompson left to become head football coach at Ripon College. Porter also coached track and freshman basketball at Neenah.

Head coaching record

Football

References

External links
 

1929 births
2013 deaths
St. Olaf Oles football coaches
St. Olaf Oles football players
St. Olaf Oles men's ice hockey coaches
St. Olaf Oles men's ice hockey players
High school basketball coaches in Wisconsin
High school football coaches in Wisconsin
High school track and field coaches in the United States
People from Stillwater, Minnesota
Coaches of American football from Minnesota
Players of American football from Minnesota
Basketball coaches from Minnesota
Ice hockey coaches from Minnesota
Ice hockey players from Minnesota